19 Cephei is a supergiant star in the northern circumpolar constellation of Cepheus.

The spectrum of 19 Cephei shows line profile variability on an hourly and daily timescale.  This is thought to be due to the changes in the stellar wind.

Double star catalogues list several companions for 19 Cephei.  The Washington Double Star Catalog describes four companions: 11th magnitude stars 20" and 56" away, and two 15th magnitude stars 4-5" away.  The Catalog of Components of Double and Multiple Stars gives only the two 11th magnitude stars.

A scattered cluster of faint stars has been detected associated with 19 Cephei.  The brightest likely members apart from 19 Cep itself are 10th magnitude stars.

References

External links
 

Cepheus (constellation)
Cephei, 19
109017
O-type supergiants
209975
08428
BD+61 2246